There was systematic political abuse of psychiatry in the Soviet Union, based on the interpretation of political opposition or dissent as a psychiatric problem. It was called "psychopathological mechanisms" of dissent.

During the leadership of General Secretary Leonid Brezhnev, psychiatry was used to disable and remove from society political opponents ("dissidents") who openly expressed beliefs that contradicted the official dogma. The term "philosophical intoxication", for instance, was widely applied to the mental disorders diagnosed when people disagreed with the country's Communist leaders and, by referring to the writings of the Founding Fathers of Marxism–Leninism—Karl Marx, Friedrich Engels, and Vladimir Lenin—made them the target of criticism.

Article 58-10 of the Stalin-era Criminal Code, "Anti-Soviet agitation", was to a considerable degree preserved in the new 1958 RSFSR Criminal Code as Article 70 "Anti-Soviet agitation and propaganda". In 1967, a weaker law, Article 190-1 "Dissemination of fabrications known to be false, which defame the Soviet political and social system", was added to the RSFSR Criminal Code. These laws were frequently applied in conjunction with the system of diagnosis for mental illness, developed by academician Andrei Snezhnevsky. Together, they established a framework within which non-standard beliefs could easily be defined as a criminal offence and the basis, subsequently, for a psychiatric diagnosis.

Applying the diagnosis 
The "anti-Soviet" political behavior of some individuals – being outspoken in their opposition to the authorities, demonstrating for reform, and writing critical books – were defined simultaneously as criminal acts (e.g., a violation of Articles 70 or 190–1), symptoms of mental illness (e.g., "delusion of reformism"), and susceptible to a ready-made diagnosis (e.g., "sluggish schizophrenia"). Within the boundaries of the diagnostic category, the symptoms of pessimism, poor social adaptation and conflict with authorities were themselves sufficient for a formal diagnosis of "sluggish schizophrenia".

The psychiatric incarceration of certain individuals was prompted by their attempts to emigrate, to distribute or possess prohibited documents or books, to participate in civil rights protests and demonstrations, and become involved in forbidden religious activities. In accordance with the doctrine of state atheism, the religious beliefs of prisoners, including those of well-educated former atheists who had become adherents of a religious faith, was considered to be a form of mental illness that required treatment. The KGB routinely sent dissenters to psychiatrists for diagnosis, in order to discredit dissidence as the product of unhealthy minds and to avoid the embarrassment caused by public trials. Highly classified government documents that became available after the dissolution of the Soviet Union confirm that the authorities consciously used psychiatry as a tool to suppress dissent.

According to the "Commentary" to the post-Soviet Russian Federation Law on Psychiatric Care, individuals forced to undergo treatment in Soviet psychiatric medical institutions were entitled to rehabilitation in accordance with the established procedure and could claim compensation. The Russian Federation acknowledged that before 1991 psychiatry had been used for political purposes and took responsibility for the victims of "political psychiatry."

The political abuse of psychiatry in Russia has continued, nevertheless, since the fall of the Soviet Union, and human rights activists may still face the threat of a psychiatric diagnosis for their legitimate civic and political activities.

Background

Definitions 

Political abuse of psychiatry is the misuse of psychiatric diagnosis, detention and treatment for the purposes of obstructing the fundamental human rights of certain groups and individuals in a society. It entails the exculpation and committal of citizens to psychiatric facilities based upon political rather than mental health-based criteria. Many authors, including psychiatrists, also use the terms "Soviet political psychiatry" or "punitive psychiatry" to refer to this phenomenon.

In his book Punitive Medicine (1979) Alexander Podrabinek defined the term "punitive medicine", which is identified with "punitive psychiatry," as "a tool in the struggle against dissidents who cannot be punished by legal means." Punitive psychiatry is neither a discrete subject nor a psychiatric specialty but, rather, it is an emergency arising within many applied sciences in totalitarian countries where members of a profession may feel themselves compelled to serve the diktats of power. Psychiatric confinement of sane people is uniformly considered a particularly pernicious form of repression and Soviet punitive psychiatry was one of the key weapons of both illegal and legal repression.

As Vladimir Bukovsky and Semyon Gluzman wrote in their joint A Manual on Psychiatry for Dissenters, "the Soviet use of psychiatry as a punitive means is based upon the deliberate interpretation of dissent... as a psychiatric problem."

An inherent capacity for abuse 
The diagnosis of mental disease can give the state license to detain persons against their will and insist upon therapy both in the interest of the detainee and in the broader interests of society. In addition, receiving a psychiatric diagnosis can itself be regarded as oppressive. In a monolithic state, psychiatry can be used to bypass standard legal procedures for establishing guilt or innocence and allow political incarceration without the ordinary odium attaching to such political trials.

In the period from the 1960s to 1986, the abuse of psychiatry for political purposes was reported to have been systematic in the Soviet Union and episodic in other Eastern European countries such as Romania, Hungary, Czechoslovakia, and Yugoslavia. The practice of incarceration of political dissidents in mental hospitals in Eastern Europe and the former USSR damaged the credibility of psychiatric practice in these states and entailed strong condemnation from the international community. Psychiatrists have been involved in human rights abuses in states across the world when the definitions of mental disease were expanded to include political disobedience. As scholars have long argued, governmental and medical institutions have at times classified threats to authority during periods of political disturbance and instability as a form of mental disease. In many countries, political prisoners are still sometimes confined and abused in mental institutions.

In the Soviet Union, dissidents were often confined in psychiatric wards commonly called psikhushkas. Psikhushka is the Russian ironic diminutive for "psychiatric hospital". One of the first penal psikhushkas was the Psychiatric Prison Hospital in the city of Kazan. In 1939, it was transferred to the control of the NKVD (the secret police and precursor of the KGB) on the orders of Lavrentiy Beria, the head of the NKVD. International human rights defenders such as Walter Reich have long recorded the methods by which Soviet psychiatrists in Psikhushka hospitals diagnosed schizophrenia in political dissenters. Western scholars examined no aspect of Soviet psychiatry as thoroughly as its involvement in the social control of political dissenters.

Under Stalin, Khrushchev and Brezhnev 

As early as 1948, the Soviet secret service took an interest in this area of medicine. One of those with overall responsibility for the Soviet secret police, pre-war Procurator General and State Prosecutor, the deputy Minister of Foreign Affairs Andrey Vyshinsky, was the first to order the use of psychiatry as a tool of repression. Russian psychiatrist Pyotr Gannushkin believed that in a class society, especially during the most severe class struggle, psychiatry was incapable of not being repressive. A system of political abuse of psychiatry was developed at the end of Joseph Stalin's regime.

Punitive psychiatry was not simply an inheritance from the Stalin era, however, according to Alexander Etkind. The Gulag, or Chief Administration for Corrective Labor Camps, was an effective instrument of political repression. There was no compelling requirement to develop an alternative and more expensive psychiatric substitute. The abuse of psychiatry was a natural product of the later Soviet era. From the mid-1970s to the 1990s, the structure of the USSR mental health service conformed to the double standard in society, being represented by two distinct systems which co-existed peacefully for the most part, despite periodic conflicts between them:
 system one was that of punitive psychiatry. It directly served the authorities and those in power, and was headed by the Moscow Institute for Forensic Psychiatry named in honour of Vladimir Serbsky;
 system two was made up of elite, psychotherapeutically oriented clinics. It was headed by the Leningrad Psychoneurological Institute named in memory of Vladimir Bekhterev.
The hundreds of hospitals in the provinces combined elements of both systems.

If someone was mentally ill then, they were sent to psychiatric hospitals and confined there until they died. If his mental health was uncertain but he was not constantly unwell, he and his kharakteristika [testimonial from employers, the Party and other Soviet institutions] were sent to a labour camp or to be shot. When allusions to socialist legality started to be made, it was decided to prosecute such people. Soon it became apparent that putting people who gave anti-Soviet speeches on trial only made matters worse for the regime. Such individuals were no longer tried in court. Instead they were given a psychiatric examination and declared insane.

The Joint Session, October 1951 

In the 1950s, the psychiatrists of the Soviet Union turned themselves into the medical arm of the Gulag State. A precursor of later abuses in psychiatry in the Soviet Union, the "Joint Session" of the USSR Academy of Medical Sciences and the Board of the All-Union Neurological and Psychiatric Association took place from 10 to 15 October 1951. The event was dedicated, supposedly, to the great Russian physiologist Ivan Pavlov, and alleged that several of the USSR's leading neuroscientists and psychiatrists of the time (among them Grunya Sukhareva, Vasily Gilyarovsky, Raisa Golant, Aleksandr Shmaryan, and Mikhail Gurevich) were guilty of practicing "anti-Pavlovian, anti-Marxist, idealistic [and] reactionary" science, and this was damaging to Soviet psychiatry.

During the Joint Session, these eminent psychiatrists, motivated by fear, had to publicly admit that their scientific positions were erroneous and they also had to promise to conform to "Pavlovian" doctrines. These public declarations of obedience proved insufficient. In the closing speech, Andrei Snezhnevsky, the lead author of the Session's policy report, stated that the accused psychiatrists "have not disarmed themselves and continue to remain in the old anti-Pavlovian positions", thereby causing "grave damage to the Soviet psychiatric research and practice". The vice president of the USSR Academy of Medical Sciences accused them of "diligently worshipping the dirty source of American pseudo-science". Those who articulated these accusations at the Joint Session – among them Irina Strelchuk, Vasily Banshchikov, Oleg Kerbikov, and Snezhnevsky – were distinguished by their careerist ambition and fear for their own positions. Not surprisingly, many of them were promoted and appointed to leadership posts shortly after the session.

The Joint Session also had a negative impact on several leading Soviet academic neuroscientists, such as Pyotr Anokhin, Aleksey Speransky, Lina Stern, Ivan Beritashvili, and Leon Orbeli. They were labeled as anti-Pavlovians, anti-materialists and reactionaries and subsequently they were dismissed from their positions. In addition to losing their laboratories some of these scientists were subjected to torture in prison. The Moscow, Leningrad, Ukrainian, Georgian, and Armenian schools of neuroscience and neurophysiology were damaged for a period due to this loss of personnel. The Joint Session ravaged productive research in neurosciences and psychiatry for years to come. Pseudo-science took control.

Following a previous joint session of the USSR Academy of Sciences and the USSR Academy of Medical Sciences (28 June–4 July 1950) and the 10-15 October 1951 joint session of the Presidium of the Academy of Medical Sciences and the Board of the All-Union Society of Neuropathologists and Psychiatrists, Snezhnevky's school was given the leading role. The 1950 decision to give monopoly over psychiatry to the Pavlovian school of Snezhnevsky was one of the crucial factors in the rise of political psychiatry. The Soviet doctors, under the incentive of Snezhnevsky, devised a "Pavlovian theory of schizophrenia" and increasingly applied this diagnostic category to political dissidents.

"Sluggish schizophrenia" 

Psychiatric diagnoses such as the diagnosis of "sluggish schizophrenia" in political dissidents in the USSR were used for political purposes. It was the diagnosis of "sluggish schizophrenia" that was most prominently used in cases of dissidents. Sluggish schizophrenia as one of the new diagnostic categories was created to facilitate the stifling of dissidents and was a root of self-deception among psychiatrists to placate their consciences when the doctors acted as a tool of oppression in the name of a political system. According to the Global Initiative on Psychiatry chief executive Robert van Voren, the political abuse of psychiatry in the USSR arose from the conception that people who opposed the Soviet regime were mentally sick since there was no other logical rationale why one would oppose the sociopolitical system considered the best in the world. The diagnosis "sluggish schizophrenia", a longstanding concept further developed by the Moscow School of Psychiatry and particularly by its chief Snezhnevsky, furnished a very handy framework for explaining this behavior.

The weight of scholarly opinion holds that the psychiatrists who played the primary role in the development of this diagnostic concept were following directives from the Communist Party and the Soviet secret service, or KGB, and were well aware of the political uses to which it would be put. Nevertheless, for many Soviet psychiatrists "sluggish schizophrenia" appeared to be a logical explanation to apply to the behavior of critics of the regime who, in their opposition, seemed willing to jeopardize their happiness, family, and career for a reformist conviction or ideal that was so apparently divergent from the prevailing social and political orthodoxy.

Snezhnevsky, the most prominent theorist of Soviet psychiatry and director of the Institute of Psychiatry of the USSR Academy of Medical Sciences, developed a novel classification of mental disorders postulating an original set of diagnostic criteria. A carefully crafted description of sluggish schizophrenia established that psychotic symptoms were non-essential for the diagnosis, but symptoms of psychopathy, hypochondria, depersonalization or anxiety were central to it. Symptoms referred to as part of the "negative axis" included pessimism, poor social adaptation, and conflict with authorities, and were themselves sufficient for a formal diagnosis of "sluggish schizophrenia with scanty symptoms". According to Snezhnevsky, patients with sluggish schizophrenia could present as quasi sane yet manifest minimal but clinically relevant personality changes which could remain unnoticed to the untrained eye. Thereby patients with non-psychotic mental disorders, or even persons who were not mentally sick, could be easily labelled with the diagnosis of sluggish schizophrenia. Along with paranoia, sluggish schizophrenia was the diagnosis most frequently used for the psychiatric incarceration of dissenters. As per the theories of Snezhnevsky and his colleagues, schizophrenia was held to be much more prevalent than previously considered, for the illness might present with comparatively slight symptoms, and might only progress afterwards. As a consequence, schizophrenia was diagnosed much more often in Moscow than in cities of other countries, as the World Health Organization Pilot Study on Schizophrenia reported in 1973. The city with the highest prevalence of schizophrenia in the world was Moscow. In particular, the scope was widened by sluggish schizophrenia because according to Snezhnevsky and his colleagues, patients with this diagnosis were capable of functioning almost normally in the social sense. Their symptoms could be like those of a neurosis or could assume a paranoid character. The patients with paranoid symptoms retained some insight into their condition but overestimated their own significance and could manifest grandiose ideas of reforming society. Thereby, sluggish schizophrenia could have such symptoms as "reform delusions", "perseverance", and "struggle for the truth". As Viktor Styazhkin reported, Snezhnevsky diagnosed a reformation delusion for every case when a patient "develops a new principle of human knowledge, drafts an academy of human happiness, and many other projects for the benefit of mankind".

In the 1960s and 1970s, theories, which contained ideas about reforming society and struggling for truth, and religious convictions were not referred to delusional paranoid disorders in practically all foreign classifications, but Soviet psychiatry, proceeding from ideological conceptions, referred critique of the political system and proposals to reform this system to the delusional construct. Diagnostic approaches of conception of sluggish schizophrenia and paranoiac states with delusion of reformism were used only in the Soviet Union and several Eastern European countries.

On the covert orders of the KGB, thousands of social and political reformers—Soviet "dissidents"—were incarcerated in mental hospitals after being labelled with diagnoses of "sluggish schizophrenia", a disease fabricated by Snezhnevsky and "Moscow school" of psychiatry. American psychiatrist Alan A. Stone stated that Western criticism of Soviet psychiatry aimed at Snezhnevsky personally, because he was essentially responsible for the Soviet concept of schizophrenia with a "sluggish type" manifestation by "reformerism" including other symptoms. One can readily apply this diagnostic scheme to dissenters. Snezhnevsky was long attacked in the West as an exemplar of psychiatric abuse in the USSR. The leading critics implied that Snezhnevsky had designed the Soviet model of schizophrenia and this diagnosis to make political dissent into a mental disease. He was charged with cynically developing a system of diagnosis which could be bent for political purposes, and he himself diagnosed or was involved in a series of famous dissident cases, and, in dozens of cases, he personally signed a commission decision on legal insanity of mentally healthy dissidents including Vladimir Bukovsky, Natalya Gorbanevskaya, Leonid Plyushch, Mikola Plakhotnyuk, and Pyotr Grigorenko.

Beginning of the trend toward mass abuse

From Khrushchev to Andropov 
The campaign to declare political opponents mentally sick and to commit dissenters to mental hospitals began in the late 1950s and early 1960s. As Vladimir Bukovsky commented on the emergence of the political abuse of psychiatry, Nikita Khrushchev reckoned that it was impossible for people in a socialist society to have an anti-socialist consciousness. Whenever manifestations of dissidence could not be justified as a provocation of world imperialism or a legacy of the past, they were self-evidently the product of mental disease. In a speech published in the  Pravda daily newspaper on 24 May 1959, Khrushchev said:

The now available evidence supports the conclusion that the system of political abuse of psychiatry was carefully designed by the KGB to rid the USSR of undesirable elements. According to several available documents and a message by a former general of the Fifth (dissident) Directorate of the Ukrainian KGB to Robert van Voren, political abuse of psychiatry as a systematic method of repression was developed by Yuri Andropov along with a selected group of associates.

Andropov was in charge of the wide-ranging deployment of psychiatric repression from the moment he was appointed to head the KGB. He became KGB Chairman on 18 May 1967. On 3 July 1967, he made a proposal to establish a Fifth Directorate (ideological counterintelligence) within the KGB to deal with internal political opposition to the Soviet regime. The Directorate was set up at the end of July and took charge of KGB files on all Soviet dissidents, including Andrei Sakharov and Alexander Solzhenitsyn. In 1968, KGB Chairman Andropov issued a departmental order "On the tasks of State security agencies in combating the ideological sabotage by the adversary", calling for the KGB to struggle against dissidents and their imperialist masters. His aim was "the destruction of dissent in all its forms" and he insisted that the positions of the capitalist countries on human rights, and their criticisms of the Soviet Union and its own politics of human rights from these positions, was just one part of a wide-ranging imperialist plot to undermine the Soviet state's foundation. Similar ideas can be found in the 1983 book Speeches and Writings by Andropov published when he had become General Secretary of the CPSU:

Implementation and the legal framework 
On 29 April 1969, Andropov submitted an elaborate plan to the Central Committee of the Communist Party of the Soviet Union to set up a network of mental hospitals that would defend the "Soviet Government and the socialist order" from dissenters. To persuade his fellow Politburo members of the risk posed by the mentally ill, Andropov circulated a report from the Krasnodar Region. A secret resolution of the USSR Council of Ministers was adopted. Andropov's proposal to use psychiatry for struggle against dissenters was adopted and implemented.

In 1929, the USSR had 70 psychiatric hospitals and 21,103 psychiatric beds. By 1935, this had increased to 102 psychiatric hospitals and 33,772 psychiatric beds, and by 1955 there were 200 psychiatric hospitals and 116,000 psychiatric beds in the Soviet Union. The Soviet authorities built psychiatric hospitals at a rapid pace and increased the quantity of beds for patients with nervous and mental illnesses: between 1962 and 1974, the number of beds for psychiatric patients increased from 222,600 to 390,000. Such an expansion in the number of psychiatric beds was expected to continue in the years up to 1980. Throughout this period the dominant trend in Soviet psychiatry ran counter to the vigorous attempts in Western countries to treat as many as possible as out-patients rather than in-patients.

On 15 May 1969, a Soviet Government decree (No. 345–209) was issued "On measures for preventing dangerous behavior (acts) on the part of mentally ill persons." This decree confirmed the practice of having undesirables hauled into detention by psychiatrists. Soviet psychiatrists were told whom they should examine and were assured that they might detain these individuals with the help of the police or entrap them into coming to the hospital. The psychiatrists thereby doubled as interrogators and as arresting officers. Doctors fabricated a diagnosis requiring detention and no court decision was required for subjecting the individual to indefinite confinement in a psychiatric institution.

By the end of the 1950s, confinement to a psychiatric institution had become the most commonly used method of punishing leaders of the political opposition. In the 1960s and 1970s, the trials of dissenters and their referral for "treatment" to the Special Psychiatric Hospitals under MVD control and oversight came out into the open, and the world learned of a wave of "psychiatric terror" which was flatly denied by those in charge of the Serbsky Institute. The bulk of psychiatric repression spans the period from the late 1960s to the early 1980s. As CPSU General Secretary, from November 1982 to February 1984, Yury Andropov demonstrated little patience with domestic dissafection and continued the Brezhnev Era policy of confining dissenters in mental hospitals.

Examination and hospitalization 
Political dissidents were usually charged under Articles 70 (agitation and propaganda against the Soviet state) and 190-1 (dissemination of false fabrications defaming the Soviet state and social system) of the RSFSR Criminal Code. Forensic psychiatrists were asked to examine offenders whose mental state was considered abnormal by the investigating officers.

In almost every case, dissidents were examined at the Serbsky Central Research Institute for Forensic Psychiatry in Moscow, where persons being prosecuted in court for committing political crimes were subjected to a forensic-psychiatric expert evaluation. Once certified, the accused and convicted were sent for involuntary treatment to the Special Psychiatric Hospitals controlled by the Ministry of Internal Affairs (MVD) of the Russian Soviet Federative Socialist Republic.

The accused had no right of appeal. The right was given to their relatives or other interested persons but they were not allowed to nominate psychiatrists to take part in the evaluation, because all psychiatrists were considered fully independent and equally credible before the law.

According to dissident poet Naum Korzhavin, the atmosphere at the Serbsky Institute in Moscow altered almost overnight when Daniil Lunts took over as head of the Fourth Department (otherwise known as the Political Department). Previously, psychiatric departments were regarded as a 'refuge' against being dispatched to the Gulag. Now that policy altered. The first reports of dissenters being hospitalized on non-medical grounds date from the early 1960s, not long after Georgy Morozov was appointed director of the Serbsky Institute. Both Morozov and Lunts were personally involved in numerous well-known cases and were notorious abusers of psychiatry for political purposes. Most prisoners, in Viktor Nekipelov's words, characterized Daniil Lunts as "no better than the criminal doctors who performed inhuman experiments on the prisoners in Nazi concentration camps."

A well-documented practice was the use of psychiatric hospitals as temporary prisons during the two or three weeks around the 7 November (October Revolution) Day and May Day celebrations, to isolate "socially dangerous" persons who otherwise might protest in public or manifest other deviant behavior.

Struggle against abuse 

In the 1960s, a vigorous movement grew up protesting against abuse of psychiatry in the USSR. Political abuse of psychiatry in the Soviet Union was denounced in the course of the Congresses of the World Psychiatric Association in Mexico City (1971), Hawaii (1977), Vienna (1983) and Athens (1989). The campaign to terminate political abuse of psychiatry in the USSR was a key episode in the Cold War, inflicting irretrievable damage on the prestige of medicine in the Soviet Union.

Classification of the victims 

Upon analysis of over 200 well-authenticated cases covering the period 1962–1976, Sidney Bloch and Peter Reddaway developed a classification of the victims of Soviet psychiatric abuse. They were classified as:
 advocates of human rights or democratization;
 nationalists;
 would-be emigrants;
 religious believers;
 citizens inconvenient to the authorities.
The advocates of human rights and democratization, according to Bloch and Reddaway, made up about half the dissidents repressed by means of psychiatry. Nationalists made up about one-tenth of the dissident population dealt with psychiatrically. Would-be emigrants constituted about one-fifth of dissidents victimized by means of psychiatry. People detained only because of their religious activity made up about fifteen per cent of dissident-patients. Citizens inconvenient to the authorities because of their "obdurate" complaints about bureaucratic excesses and abuses accounted for about five per cent of dissidents subject to psychiatric abuse.

Incomplete figures 
In 1985, Peter Reddaway and Sidney Bloch provided documented data on some five hundred cases in their book Soviet Psychiatric Abuse.

True scale of repression 

On basis of the available data and materials accumulated in the archives of the International Association on the Political Use of Psychiatry, one can confidently conclude that thousands of dissenters were hospitalized for political reasons. From 1994 to 1995, an investigative commission of Moscow psychiatrists explored the records of five prison psychiatric hospitals in Russia and discovered about two thousand cases of political abuse of psychiatry in these hospitals alone. In 2004, Anatoly Prokopenko said he was surprised at the facts obtained by him from the official classified top secret documents by the Central Committee of the CPSU, by the KGB, and MVD. According to his calculations based on what he found in the documents, about 15,000 people were confined for political crimes in the psychiatric prison hospitals under the control of the MVD. In 2005, referring to the Archives of the CPSU Central Committee and the records of the three Special Psychiatrial Hospitals — Sychyovskaya, Leningrad and Chernyakhovsk hospitals — to which human rights activists gained access in 1991, Prokopenko concluded that psychiatry had been used as punitive measure against about 20,000 people for purely political reasons. This was only a small part of the total picture, Prokopenko said. The data on the total number of people who had been held in all sixteen prison hospitals and in the 1,500 "open" psychiatric hospitals remains unknown because parts of the archives of the prison psychiatric hospitals and hospitals in general are classified and inaccessible. The figure of fifteen or twenty thousand political prisoners in psychiatric hospitals run by the Soviet Ministry of Internal Affairs was first put forward by Prokopenko in the 1997 book Mad Psychiatry ("Безумная психиатрия"), which was republished in 2005.

An indication of the extent of the political abuse of psychiatry in the USSR is provided by Semyon Gluzman's calculation that the percentage of "the mentally ill" among those accused of so-called anti-Soviet activities proved many times higher than among criminal offenders. The attention paid to political prisoners by Soviet psychiatrists was more than 40 times greater than their attention to ordinary criminal offenders. This derives from the following comparison: 1–2% of all the forensic psychiatric examinations carried out by the Serbsky Institute targeted those accused of anti-Soviet activities; convicted dissidents in penal institutions made up 0.05% of the total number of convicts; 1–2% is 40 times greater than 0.05%.

According to Viktor Luneyev, the struggle against dissent operated on many more layers than those registered in court sentences. We do not know how many the secret services kept under surveillance, held criminally liable, arrested, sent to psychiatric hospitals, or who were sacked from their jobs, and restricted in all kinds of other ways in the exercise of their rights. No objective assessment of the total number of repressed persons is possible without fundamental analysis of archival documents. The difficulty is that the required data are very diverse and are not to be found in a single archive. They are scattered between the State Archive of the Russian Federation, the archive of the Russian Federation State Statistical Committee (Goskomstat), the archives of the RF Ministry of Internal Affairs (MVD of Russia), the FSB of Russia, the RF General Prosecutor's Office, and the Russian Military and Historical Archive. Further documents are held in the archives of 83 constituent entities of the Russian Federation, in urban and regional archives, as well as in the archives of the former Soviet Republics, now the 11 independent countries of the Commonwealth of Independent States or the three Baltic States (Baltics).

Concealment of the data 

According to Russian psychiatrist Emmanuil Gushansky, the scale of psychiatric abuses in the past, the use of psychiatric doctrines by the totalitarian state have been thoroughly concealed. The archives of the Soviet Ministries of Internal Affairs (MVD) and Health (USSR Health Ministry), and of the Serbsky Institute for Forensic Psychiatry, which between them hold evidence about the expansion of psychiatry and the regulations governing that expansion, remain totally closed to researchers, says Gushansky. Dan Healey shares his opinion that the abuses of Soviet psychiatry under Stalin and, even more dramatically, in the 1960s to 1980s remain under-researched: the contents of the main archives are still classified and inaccessible. Hundreds of files on people who underwent forensic psychiatric examinations at the Serbsky Institute during Stalin's time are on the shelves of the highly classified archive in its basement where Gluzman saw them in 1989. All are marked by numbers without names or surnames, and any biographical data they contain is unresearched and inaccessible to researchers.

Anatoly Sobchak, the former Mayor of Saint Petersburg, wrote:

In Ukraine, a study of the origins of the political abuse of psychiatry was conducted for five years on the basis of the State archives. A total of 60 people were again examined. All were citizens of Ukraine, convicted of political crimes and hospitalized on the territory of Ukraine. Not one of them, it turned out, was in need of any psychiatric treatment.

From 1993 to 1995, a presidential decree on measures to prevent future abuse of psychiatry was being drafted at the Commission for Rehabilitation of the Victims of Political Repression. For this purpose, Anatoly Prokopenko selected suitable archival documents and, at the request of Vladimir Naumov, the head of research and publications at the commission, Emmanuil Gushansky drew up the report. It correlated the archival data presented to Gushansky with materials received during his visits, conducted jointly with the commission of the Independent Psychiatric Association of Russia, to several strict-regime psychiatric hospitals (former Special Hospitals under MVD control). When the materials for discussion in the Commission for Rehabilitation of the Victims of Political Repression were ready, however, the work came to a standstill. The documents failed to reach the head of the Commission Alexander Yakovlev.

The report on political abuse of psychiatry prepared at the request of the commission by Gushansky with the aid of Prokopenko lay unclaimed and even the Independent Psychiatric Journal (Nezavisimiy Psikhiatricheskiy Zhurnal) would not publish it. The Moscow Research Center for Human Rights headed by Boris Altshuler and Alexey Smirnov and the Independent Psychiatric Association of Russia whose president is Yuri Savenko were asked by Gushansky to publish the materials and archival documents on punitive psychiatry but showed no interest in doing so. Publishing such documents is dictated by present-day needs and by how far it is feared that psychiatry could again be abused for non-medical purposes.

In its 2000 report, the Commission for Rehabilitation of the Victims of Political Repression included only the following four phrases about the political abuse of psychiatry:

In the 1988 and 1989, about two million people were removed from the psychiatric registry at the request of Western psychiatrists. It was one of their conditions for the re-admission of Soviet psychiatrists to the World Psychiatric Association. Yury Savenko has provided different figures in different publications: about one million, up to one and a half million, about one and a half million people removed from the psychiatric registry. Mikhail Buyanov provided the figure of over two million people removed from the psychiatric registry.

Theoretical analysis 
In 1990, Psychiatric Bulletin of the Royal College of Psychiatrists published the article "Compulsion in psychiatry: blessing or curse?" by Russian psychiatrist Anatoly Koryagin. It contains analysis of the abuse of psychiatry and eight arguments by which the existence of a system of political abuse of psychiatry in the USSR can easily be demonstrated. As Koryagin wrote, in a dictatorial State with a totalitarian regime, such as the USSR, the laws have at all times served not the purpose of self-regulation of the life of society but have been one of the major levers by which to manipulate the behavior of subjects. Every Soviet citizen has constantly been straight considered state property and been regarded not as the aim, but as a means to achieve the rulers' objectives. From the perspective of state pragmatism, a mentally sick person was regarded as a burden to society, using up the state's material means without recompense and not producing anything, and even potentially capable of inflicting harm. Therefore, the Soviet State never considered it reasonable to pass special legislative acts protecting the material and legal part of the patients' life. It was only instructions of the legal and medical departments that stipulated certain rules of handling the mentally sick and imposing different sanctions on them. A person with a mental disorder was automatically divested of all rights and depended entirely on the psychiatrists' will. Practically anybody could undergo psychiatric examination on the most senseless grounds and the issued diagnosis turned him into a person without rights. It was this lack of legal rights and guarantees that advantaged a system of repressive psychiatry in the country.

According to American psychiatrist Oleg Lapshin, Russia until 1993 did not have any specific legislation in the field of mental health except uncoordinated instructions and articles of laws in criminal and administrative law, orders of the USSR Ministry of Health. In the Soviet Union, any psychiatric patient could be hospitalized by request of his headman, relatives or instructions of a district psychiatrist. In this case, patient's consent or dissent mattered not. The duration of treatment in a psychiatric hospital also depended entirely on the psychiatrist. All of that made the abuse of psychiatry possible to suppress those who opposed the political regime, and that created the vicious practice of ignoring the rights of the mentally ill.

According to Yuri Savenko, the president of the Independent Psychiatric Association of Russia (the IPA), punitive psychiatry arises on the basis of the interference of three main factors:
 The ideologizing of science, its breakaway from the achievements of world psychiatry, the party orientation of Soviet forensic psychiatry.
 The lack of legal basis.
 The total nationalization of mental health service.
Their interaction system is principally sociological: the presence of the Penal Code article on slandering the state system inevitably results in sending a certain percentage of citizens to forensic psychiatric examination. Thus, it is not psychiatry itself that is punitive, but the totalitarian state uses psychiatry for punitive purposes with ease.

According to Larry Gostin, the root cause of the problem was the State itself. The definition of danger was radically extended by the Soviet criminal system to cover "political" as well as customary physical types of "danger". As Bloch and Reddaway note, there are no objective reliable criteria to determine whether the person's behavior will be dangerous, and approaches to the definition of dangerousness greatly differ among psychiatrists.

Richard Bonnie, a professor of law and medicine at the University of Virginia School of Law, mentioned the deformed nature of the Soviet psychiatric profession as one of the explanations for why it was so easily bent toward the repressive objectives of the state, and pointed out the importance of a civil society and, in particular, independent professional organizations separate and apart from the state as one of the most substantial lessons from the period.

According to Norman Sartorius, a former president of the World Psychiatric Association, political abuse of psychiatry in the former Soviet Union was facilitated by the fact that the national classification included categories that could be employed to label dissenters, who could then be forcibly incarcerated and kept in psychiatric hospitals for "treatment". Darrel Regier, vice-chair of the DSM-5 task force, has a similar opinion that the political abuse of psychiatry in the USSR was sustained by the existence of a classification developed in the Soviet Union and used to organize psychiatric treatment and care. In this classification, there were categories with diagnoses that could be given to political dissenters and led to the harmful involuntary medication.

According to Moscow psychiatrist Alexander Danilin, the so-called "nosological" approach in the Moscow psychiatric school established by Snezhnevsky boils down to the ability to make the only diagnosis, schizophrenia; psychiatry is not science but such a system of opinions and people by the thousands are falling victims to these opinions—millions of lives were crippled by virtue of the concept "sluggish schizophrenia" introduced some time once by an academician Snezhnevsky, whom Danilin called a state criminal.

St Petersburg academic psychiatrist professor Yuri Nuller notes that the concept of Snezhnevsky's school allowed psychiatrists to consider, for example, schizoid psychopathy and even schizoid character traits as early, delayed in their development, stages of the inevitable progredient process, rather than as personality traits inherent to the individual, the dynamics of which might depend on various external factors. The same also applied to a number of other personality disorders. It entailed the extremely broadened diagnostics of sluggish (neurosis-like, psychopathy-like) schizophrenia. Despite a number of its controversial premises and in line with the traditions of then Soviet science, Snezhnevsky's hypothesis has immediately acquired the status of dogma which was later overcome in other disciplines but firmly stuck in psychiatry. Snezhnevsky's concept, with its dogmatism, proved to be psychologically comfortable for many psychiatrists, relieving them from doubt when making a diagnosis. That carried a great danger: any deviation from a norm evaluated by a doctor could be regarded as an early phase of schizophrenia, with all ensuing consequences. It resulted in the broad opportunity for voluntary and involuntary abuses of psychiatry. However, Snezhnevsky did not take civil and scientific courage to reconsider his concept which clearly reached a deadlock.

According to American psychiatrist Walter Reich, the misdiagnoses of dissidents resulted from some characteristics of Soviet psychiatry that were distortions of standard psychiatric logic, theory, and practice.

According to Semyon Gluzman, abuse of psychiatry to suppress dissent is based on condition of psychiatry in a totalitarian state. Psychiatric paradigm of a totalitarian state is culpable for its expansion into spheres which are not initially those of psychiatric competence. Psychiatry as a social institution, formed and functioning in the totalitarian state, is incapable of not being totalitarian. Such psychiatry is forced to serve the two differently directed principles: care and treatment of mentally ill citizens, on the one hand, and psychiatric repression of people showing political or ideological dissent, on the other hand. In the conditions of the totalitarian state, independent-minded psychiatrists appeared and may again appear, but these few people cannot change the situation in which thousands of others, who were brought up on incorrect pseudoscientific concepts and fear of the state, will sincerely believe that the uninhibited, free thinking of a citizen is a symptom of madness. Gluzman specifies the following six premises for the unintentional participation of doctors in abuses:
 The specificity, in the totalitarian state, of the psychiatric paradigm tightly sealed from foreign influences.
 The lack of legal conscience in most citizens including doctors.
 Disregard for fundamental human rights on the part of the lawmaker and law enforcement agencies.
 Declaratory nature or the absence of legislative acts that regulate providing psychiatric care in the country. The USSR, for example, adopted such an act only in 1988.
 The absolute state paternalism of totalitarian regimes, which naturally gives rise to the dominance of the archaic paternalistic ethical concept in medical practice. Professional consciousness of the doctor is based on the almost absolute right to make decisions without the patient's consent (i.e. there is disregard for the principle of informed consent to treatment or withdrawal from it).
 The fact, in psychiatric hospitals, of frustratingly bad conditions, which refer primarily to the poverty of health care and inevitably lead to the dehumanization of the personnel including doctors.
Gluzman says that there, of course, may be a different approach to the issue expressed by Michel Foucault.
According to Michael Perlin, Foucault in his book Madness and Civilization documented the history of using institutional psychiatry as a political tool, researched the expanded use of the public hospitals in the 17th century in France and came to the conclusion that "confinement [was an] answer to an economic crisis... reduction of wages, unemployment, scarcity of coin" and, by the 18th century, the psychiatric hospitals satisfied "the indissociably economic and moral demand for confinement."

In 1977, British psychiatrist David Cooper asked Foucault the same question which Claude Bourdet had formerly asked Viktor Fainberg during a press conference given by Fainberg and Leonid Plyushch: when the USSR has the whole penitentiary and police apparatus, which could take charge of anybody, and which is perfect in itself, why do they use psychiatry? Foucault answered it was not a question of a distortion of the use of psychiatry but that was its fundamental project. In the discussion Confinement, Psychiatry, Prison, Foucault states the cooperation of psychiatrists with the KGB in the Soviet Union was not abuse of medicine, but an evident case and "condensation" of psychiatry's "inheritance", an "intensification, the ossification of a kinship structure that has never ceased to function." Foucault believed that the abuse of psychiatry in the USSR of the 1960s was a logical extension of the invasion of psychiatry into the legal system. In the discussion with Jean Laplanche and Robert Badinter, Foucault says that criminologists of the 1880—1900s started speaking surprisingly modern language: "The crime cannot be, for the criminal, but an abnormal, disturbed behavior. If he upsets society, it's because he himself is upset". This led to the twofold conclusions. First, "the judicial apparatus is no longer useful." The judges, as men of law, understand such complex, alien legal issues, purely psychological matters no better than the criminal. So commissions of psychiatrists and physicians should be substituted for the judicial apparatus. And in this vein, concrete projects were proposed. Second, "We must certainly treat this individual who is dangerous only because he is sick. But, at the same time, we must protect society against him." Hence comes the idea of mental isolation with a mixed function: therapeutic and prophylactic. In the 1900s, these projects have given rise to very lively responses from European judicial and political bodies. However, they found a wide field of applications when the Soviet Union became one of the most common but by no means exceptional cases.

According to American psychiatrist Jonas Robitscher, psychiatry has been playing a part in controlling deviant behavior for three hundred years. Vagrants, "originals," eccentrics, and homeless wanderers who did little harm but were vexatious to the society they lived in were, and sometimes still are, confined to psychiatric hospitals or deprived of their legal rights. Some critics of psychiatry consider the practice as a political use of psychiatry and regard psychiatry as promoting timeserving.

As Vladimir Bukovsky and Semyon Gluzman point out, it is difficult for the average Soviet psychiatrist to understand the dissident's poor adjustment to Soviet society. This view of dissidence has nothing surprising about it—conformity reigned in Soviet consciousness; a public intolerance of non-conformist behavior always penetrated Soviet culture; and the threshold for deviance from custom was similarly low.

An example of the low threshold is a point of Donetsk psychiatrist Valentine Pekhterev, who argues that psychiatrists speak of the necessity of adapting oneself to society, estimate the level of man's social functioning, his ability to adequately test the reality and so forth. In Pekhterev's words, these speeches hit point-blank on the dissidents and revolutionaries, because all of them are poorly functioning in society, are hardly adapting to it either initially or after increasing requirements. They turn their inability to adapt themselves to society into the view that the company breaks step and only they know how to help the company restructure itself. The dissidents regard the cases of personal maladjustment as a proof of public ill-being. The more such cases, the easier it is to present their personal ill-being as public one. They bite the society's hand that feed them only because they are not given a right place in society. Unlike the dissidents, the psychiatrists destroy the hardly formed defense attitude in the dissidents by regarding "public well-being" as personal one. The psychiatrists extract teeth from the dissidents, stating that they should not bite the feeding hand of society only because the tiny group of the dissidents feel bad being at their place. The psychiatrists claim the need to treat not society but the dissidents and seek to improve society by preserving and improving the mental health of its members. After reading the book Institute of Fools by Viktor Nekipelov, Pekhterev concluded that allegations against the psychiatrists sounded from the lips of a negligible but vociferous part of inmates who when surfeiting themselves with cakes pretended to be sufferers.

According to the response by Robert van Voren, Pekhterev in his article condescendingly argues that the Serbsky Institute was not so bad place and that Nekipelov exaggerates and slanders it, but Pekhterev, by doing so, misses the main point: living conditions in the Serbsky Institute were not bad, those who passed through psychiatric examination there were in a certain sense "on holiday" in comparison with the living conditions of the Gulag; and all the same, everyone was aware that the Serbsky Institute was more than the "gates of hell" from where people were sent to specialized psychiatric hospitals in Chernyakhovsk, Dnepropetrovsk, Kazan, Blagoveshchensk, and that is not all. Their life was transformed to unimaginable horror with daily tortures by forced administration of drugs, beatings and other forms of punishment. Many went crazy, could not endure what was happening to them, some even died during the "treatment" (for example, a miner from Donetsk Alexey Nikitin). Many books and memoirs are written about the life in the psychiatric Gulag and every time when reading them a shiver seizes us. The Soviet psychiatric terror in its brutality and targeting the mentally ill as the most vulnerable group of society had nothing on the Nazi euthanasia programs. The punishment by placement in a mental hospital was as effective as imprisonment in Mordovian concentration camps in breaking persons psychologically and physically. The recent history of the USSR should be given a wide publicity to immunize society against possible repetitions of the Soviet practice of political abuse of psychiatry. The issue remains highly relevant.

According to Fedor Kondratev, an expert of the Serbsky Center and supporter of Snezhnevsky and his colleagues who developed the concept of sluggish schizophrenia in the 1960s, those arrested by the KGB under RSFSR Criminal Code Article 70 ("anti-Soviet agitation and propaganda"), 190-1 ("dissemination of knowingly false fabrications that defame the Soviet state and social system") made up, in those years, the main group targeted by the period of using psychiatry for political purposes. It was they who began to be searched for "psychopathological mechanisms" and, therefore, mental illness which gave the grounds to recognize an accused person as mentally incompetent, to debar him from appearance and defence in court, and then to send him for compulsory treatment to a special psychiatric hospital of the Ministry of Internal Affairs. The trouble (not guilt) of Soviet psychiatric science was its theoretical overideologization as a result of the strict demand to severely preclude any deviations from the "exclusively scientific" concept of Marxism–Leninism. This showed, in particular, in the fact that Soviet psychiatry under the totalitarian regime considered that penetrating the inner life of an ill person was flawed psychologization, existentionalization. In this connection, one did not admit the possibility that an individual can behave "in a different way than others do" not only because of his mental illness but on the ground alone of his moral sets consistently with his conscience. It entailed the consequence: if a person different from all others opposes the political system, one needs to search for "psychopathological mechanisms" of his dissent. Even in cases when catamnesis confirmed the correctness of a diagnosis of schizophrenia, it did not always mean that mental disorders were the cause of dissent and, all the more, that one needed to administer compulsory treatment "for it" in special psychiatric hospitals. What seems essential is another fact that the mentally ill could oppose the totalitarianism as well, by no means due to their "psychopathological mechanisms", but as persons who, despite having the diagnosis of schizophrenia, retained moral civic landmarks. Any ill person with schizophrenia could be a dissident if his conscience could not keep silent, Kondratev says.

According to St Petersburg psychiatrist Vladimir Pshizov, with regard to punitive psychiatry, the nature of psychiatry is of such a sort that using psychiatrists against opponents of authorities is always tempting for the authorities, because it is seemingly possible not to take into account an opinion by the person who received a diagnosis. Therefore, the issue will always remain relevant. While we do not have government policy of using psychiatry for repression, psychiatrists and former psychiatric nomenklatura retained the same on-the-spot reflexes.

As Ukrainian psychiatrist Ada Korotenko notes, the use of punitive psychiatry allowed of avoiding the judicial procedure during which the accused might declare the impossibility to speak publicly and the violation of their civil rights. Making a psychiatric diagnosis is insecure and can be based on a preconception. Moreover, while diagnosing mental illness, subjective fuzzy diagnostic criteria are involved as arguments. The lack of clear diagnostic criteria and clearly defined standards of diagnostics contributes to applying punitive psychiatry to vigorous and gifted citizens who disagree with authorities. At the same time, most psychiatrists incline to believe that such a misdiagnosis is less dangerous than not diagnosing mental illness.

German psychiatrist Hanfried Helmchen says the uncertainty of diagnosis is prone to other than medical influence, e.g., political influence, as was the case with Soviet dissenters who were stifled by a psychiatric diagnosis, especially that of "sluggish schizophrenia," in order to take them away from society in special psychiatric hospitals.

According to Russian psychologist Dmitry Leontev, punitive psychiatry in the Soviet Union was based on the assumption that only a madman can go against public dogma and seek for truth and justice.

K. Fulford, A. Smirnov, and E. Snow state: "An important vulnerability factor, therefore, for the abuse of psychiatry, is the subjective nature of the observations on which psychiatric diagnosis currently depends." The concerns about political abuse of psychiatry as a tactic of controlling dissent have been regularly voiced by American psychiatrist Thomas Szasz, and he mentioned that these authors, who correctly emphasized the value-laden nature of psychiatric diagnoses and the subjective character of psychiatric classifications, failed to accept the role of psychiatric power. Musicologists, drama critics, art historians, and many other scholars also create their own subjective classifications; however, lacking state-legitimated power over persons, their classifications do not lead to anyone's being deprived of property, liberty, or life. For instance, plastic surgeon's classification of beauty is subjective, but the plastic surgeon cannot treat his or her patient without the patient's consent, therefore, there cannot be any political abuse of plastic surgery. The bedrock of political medicine is coercion masquerading as medical treatment. What transforms coercion into therapy are physicians diagnosing the person's condition an "illness," declaring the intervention they impose on the victim a "treatment," and legislators and judges legitimating these categorizations as "illnesses" and "treatments." In the same way, physician-eugenicists advocated killing certain disabled or ill persons as a form of treatment for both society and patient long before the Nazis came to power. Szasz argued that the spectacle of the Western psychiatrists loudly condemning Soviet colleagues for their abuse of professional standards was largely an exercise in hypocrisy. Psychiatric abuse, such as people usually associated with practices in the former USSR, was connected not with the misuse of psychiatric diagnoses, but with the political power built into the social role of the psychiatrist in democratic and totalitarian societies alike. Psychiatrically and legally fit subjects for involuntary mental hospitalization had always been "dissidents." It is the contents and contours of dissent that has changed. Before the American Civil War, dissent was constituted by being a Negro and wanting to escape from slavery. In Soviet Russia, dissent was constituted by wanting to "reform" Marxism or emigrate to escape from it. As Szasz put it, "the classification by slave owners and slave traders of certain individuals as Negroes was scientific, in the sense that whites were rarely classified as blacks. But that did not prevent the "abuse" of such racial classification, because (what we call) its abuse was, in fact, its use." The collaboration between psychiatry and government leads to what Szasz calls the "Therapeutic State", a system in which disapproved actions, thoughts, and emotions are repressed ("cured") through pseudomedical interventions. Thus suicide, unconventional religious beliefs, racial bigotry, unhappiness, anxiety, shyness, sexual promiscuity, shoplifting, gambling, overeating, smoking, and illegal drug use are all considered symptoms or illnesses that need to be cured.

As Michael Robertson and Garry Walter suppose, psychiatric power in practically all societies expands on the grounds of public safety, which, in the view of the leaders of the USSR, was best maintained by the repression of dissidence. According to Gwen Adshead, a British forensic psychotherapist at the Broadmoor Hospital, the question is what is meant by the word "abnormal." Evidently it is possible for abnormal to be identified as "socially inappropriate." If that is the case, social and political dissent is turned into a symptom by the medical terminology, and thereby becomes an individual's personal problem, not a social matter.

According to Russian psychiatrist Emmanuil Gushansky, psychiatry is the only medical specialty in which the doctor is given the right to violence for the benefit of the patient. The application of violence must be based on the mental health law, must be as much as possible transparent and monitored by representatives of the interests of persons who are in need of involuntary examination and treatment. While being hospitalized in a psychiatric hospital for urgent indications, the patient should be accompanied by his relatives, witnesses, or other persons authorized to control the actions of doctors and law-enforcement agencies. Otherwise, psychiatry becomes an obedient maid for administrative and governmental agencies and is deprived of its medical function. It is the police that must come to the aid of citizens and is responsible for their security. Only later, after the appropriate legal measures for social protection have been taken, the psychiatrist must respond to the queries of law enforcement and judicial authorities by solving the issues of involuntary hospitalization, sanity, etc. In Russia, all that goes by opposites. The psychiatrist is vested with punitive functions, is involved in involuntary hospitalization, the state machine hides behind his back, actually manipulating the doctor. The police are reluctant to investigate offences committed by the mentally ill. After receiving the information about their disease, the bodies of inquiry very often stop the investigation and do not bring it to the level of investigative actions. Thereby psychiatry becomes a cloak for the course of justice and, by doing so, serves as a source for the rightlessness and stigmatization of both psychiatrists and persons with mental disorders. The negative attitude to psychiatrists is thereby supported by the state machine and is accompanied by the aggression against the doctors, which increases during the periods of social unrest.

Vladimir Bukovsky, well known for his struggle against political abuse of psychiatry in the Soviet Union, explained that using psychiatry against dissidents was usable to the KGB because hospitalization did not have an end date, and, as a result, there were cases when dissidents were kept in psychiatric prison hospitals for 10 or even 15 years. "Once they pump you with drugs, they can forget about you", he said and added, "I saw people who basically were asleep for years."

US President Ronald Reagan attributed the view that the "brutal treatment of Soviet dissidents was due to bureaucratic inertia."

Residual problems 
In the opinion of the Moscow Helsinki Group chairwoman Lyudmila Alexeyeva, the attribution of a mental illness to a prominent figure who came out with a political declaration or action is the most significant factor in the assessment of psychiatry during the 1960–1980s. The practice of forced confinement of political dissidents in psychiatric facilities in the former USSR and Eastern Europe destroyed the credibility of psychiatric practice in these countries. When the psychiatric profession is discredited in one part of the world, psychiatry is discredited throughout the world. Psychiatry lost its professional basis entirely when it was abused to stifle dissidence in the former USSR and in the euthanasia program in Nazi Germany. There is little doubt that the capacity for using psychiatry to enforce social norms and even political interests is immense. Now psychiatry is vulnerable because many of its notions have been questioned, and the sustainable pattern of mental life, of boundaries of mental norm and abnormality has been lost, director of the Moscow Research Institute for Psychiatry Valery Krasnov says, adding that psychiatrists have to seek new reference points to make clinical assessments and new reference points to justify old therapeutical interventions.

As Emmanuil Gushansky states, today subjective position of a Russian patient toward a medical psychologist and psychiatrist is defensive in nature and prevents the attempt to understand the patient and help him assess his condition. Such a position is related to constant, subconscious fear of psychiatrists and psychiatry. This fear is caused by not only abuse of psychiatry, but also constant violence in the totalitarian and post-totalitarian society. The psychiatric violence and psychiatric arrogance as one of manifestations of such violence is related to the primary emphasis on symptomatology and biological causes of a disease, while ignoring psychological, existential, and psychodynamic factors. Gushainsky notices that the modern Russian psychiatry and the structure of providing mental health care are aimed not at protecting the patient's right to an own place in life, but at discrediting such a right, revealing symptoms and isolating the patient.

The psychiatrist became a scarecrow attaching psychiatric labels. He is feared, is not confided, is not taken into confidence in the secrets of one's soul and is asked to provide only medications. Psychiatric labels, or stigmas, have spread so widely that there is no such thing as the media that does not call a disliked person schizo and does not generalize psychiatric assessments to phenomena of public life. The word psikhushka entered everyday vocabulary. All persons who deviate from the usual standards of thought and behavior are declared mentally ill, with an approving giggling of public. Not surprisingly, during such a stigmatization, people with real mental disorders fear publicity like the plague. Vilnius psychologist Oleg Lapin has the same point that politicians and the press attach psychological, psychiatric and medical labels; he adds that psychiatry has acquired the new status of normalizing life that was previously possessed by religion. Formerly, one could say: you are going against God or God is with us; now one can say: I behave reasonably, adequately, and you do not behave in that way. In 2007, Alexander Dugin, a professor at the Moscow State University and adviser to State Duma speaker Sergei Naryshkin, presented opponents of Vladimir Putin's policy as mentally ill by saying, "There are no longer opponents of Putin's policy, and if there are, they are mentally ill and should be sent to prophylactic health examination." In The Moscow Regional Psychiatric Newspaper of 2012, psychiatrist Dilya Enikeyeva in violation of medical privacy and ethics publicized the diagnosis of histrionic personality disorder, which she in absentia gave Kseniya Sobchak, a Russian TV anchor and a member of political opposition, and stated that Sobchak was harmful to society.

Robert van Voren noted that after the fall of the Berlin Wall, it became apparent that the political abuse of psychiatry in the USSR was only the tip of the iceberg, the sign that much more was basically wrong. This much more realistic image of Soviet psychiatry showed up only after the Soviet regime began to loosen its grip on society and later lost control over the developments and in the end entirely disintegrated. It demonstrated that the actual situation was much sorer and that many individuals had been affected. Millions of individuals were treated and stigmatized by an outdated biologically oriented and hospital-based mental health service. Living conditions in clinics were bad, sometimes even terrible, and violations of human rights were rampant. According to the data of a census published in 1992, the mortality of the ill with schizophrenia exceeded that of the general population by 4–6 times for the age of 20–39 years, by 3–4 times for the age of 30–39 years, by 1.5–2 times for the age over 40 years (larger values are for women).

According to Robert van Voren, although for several years, especially after the implosion of the USSR and during the first years of Boris Yeltsin's rule, the positions of the Soviet psychiatric leaders were in jeopardy, now one can firmly conclude that they succeeded in riding out the storm and retaining their powerful positions. They also succeeded in avoiding an inflow of modern concepts of delivering mental health care and a fundamental change in the structure of psychiatric services in Russia. On the whole, in Russia, the impact of mental health reformers has been the least. Even the reform efforts made in such places as St. Petersburg, Tomsk, and Kaliningrad have faltered or were encapsulated as centrist policies under Putin brought them back under control.

Throughout the post-communist period, the pharmaceutical industry has mainly been an obstacle to reform. Aiming to explore the vast market of the former USSR, they used the situation to make professionals and services totally dependent on their financial sustenance, turned the major attention to the availability of medicines rather than that of psycho-social rehabilitation services, and stimulated corruption within the mental health sector very much.

At the turn of the century, the psychiatric reform that had been implemented by Franco Basaglia in Italy became known and was publicly declared to be implemented in Russia, with the view of retrenchment of expenditures. But when it became clear that even more money was needed for the reform, it got bogged down in the same way the reform of the army and many other undertakings did. Russia is decades behind the countries of the European Union in mental health reform, which has already been implemented or is being implemented in them. Until Russian society, Gushansky says, is aware of the need for mental health reform, we will live in the atmosphere of animosity, mistrust and violence. Many experts believe that problems spread beyond psychiatry to society as a whole. As Robert van Voren supposes, the Russians want to have their compatriots with mental disorders locked up outside the city and do not want to have them in community. Despite the 1992 Russian Mental Health Law, coercive psychiatry in Russia remains generally unregulated and fashioned by the same trends toward hyperdiagnosis and overreliance on institutional care characteristic of the Soviet period. In the Soviet Union, there had been an increase of the bed numbers because psychiatric services had been used to treat dissidents.

In 2005, the Russian Federation had one of the highest levels of psychiatric beds per capita in Europe at 113.2 per 100,000 population, or more than 161,000 beds. In 2014, Russia has 104.8 beds per 100,000 population and no actions have been taken to arrange new facilities for outpatient services. Persons who do not respond well to treatment at dispensaries can be sent to long-term social care institutions (internats) wherein they remain indefinitely. The internats are managed by oblast Social Protection ministries. Russia had 442 psychoneurologic internats by 1999, and their number amounted to 505 by 2013. The internats provided places for approximately 125,000 people in 2007. In 2013, Russian psychoneurologic internats accommodated 146,000 people, according to the consolidated data of the Department of Social Protection of Moscow and the Ministry of Labour and Social Protection of the Russian Federation. It is supposed that the number of beds in internats is increasing at the same rate with which the number of beds is decreasing in psychiatric hospitals. Lyubov Vinogradova of the Independent Psychiatric Association of Russia provides the different figure of 122,091 or 85.5 places in psychoneurologic institutions of social protection (internats) per 100,000 population in 2013 and says that Russia is high on Europe's list of the number of places in the institutions. Vinogradova states that many regions have the catastrophic shortage of places in psychoneurological internats, her words point out to the need to increase the number of places there and to the fact that the Independent Psychiatric Association of Russia is forcing transinstitutionalization—relocating the mentally ill from their homes and psychiatric hospitals to psychoneurological internats.

At his press conference in 2008, Semyon Gluzman said that the surplus in Ukraine of hospitals for inpatient treatment of the mentally ill was a relic of the totalitarian communist regime and that Ukraine did not have epidemic of schizophrenia but somehow Ukraine had about 90 large psychiatric hospitals including the Pavlov Hospital where beds in its children's unit alone were more than in the whole of Great Britain. In Ukraine, public opinion did not contribute to the protection of citizens against possible recurrence of political abuse of psychiatry. There were no demonstrations and rallies in support of the mental health law. But there was a public campaign against developing the civilized law and against liberalizing the provision of psychiatric care in the country. The campaign was initiated and conducted by relatives of psychiatric patients. They wrote to newspapers, yelled in busy places and around them, behaved in the unbridled way in ministerial offices and corridors. Once Gluzman saw through a trolleybus window a group of 20-30 people standing by a window of the Cabinet of Ministers of Ukraine with red flags, portraits of Lenin and Stalin and the slogan coarsely written on the white cardboard: "Get the Gluzman psychiatry off Ukraine!" Activists of the dissident movement far from the nostalgia for the past also participated in the actions against changes in the mental health system. But in general, it should be remembered that all these protest actions have been activated by nomenklatura psychiatrists. The whole Ukrainian psychiatric system actually consists of the two units: hospital for treatment of acute psychiatric conditions and internat-hospice for helpless "chronic patients" unable to live on their own. And between hospital and internat-hospice is desert. That is why about 40 percent of patients in any Ukrainian psychiatric hospital are so-called social patients whose stay in the psychiatric hospital is not due to medical indications. A similar pattern is in internats. A significant part of their lifelong customers could have lived long enough in society despite their mental illnesses. They could have lived quite comfortably and safely for themselves and others in special dorms, nursing homes, "halfway houses". Ukraine does not have anything like that.

In the Soviet times, mental hospitals were frequently created in former monasteries, barracks, and even concentration camps. Sofia Dorinskaya, a human rights activist and psychiatrist, says she saw former convicts who have been living in a Russian mental hospital for ten years and will have been staying there until their dying day because of having no home. Deinstitutionalization has not touched many of the hospitals, and persons still die inside them. In 2013, 70 persons died in a fire just outside Novgorod and Moscow. Living conditions are often insufficient and sometimes horrible: 12 to 15 patients in a big room with bars on the windows, no bedside tables, often no partitions, not enough toilets. The number of outpatient clinics designed for the primary care of the mentally disordered stopped increasing in 2005 and was reduced to 277 in 2012 as against 318 in 2005. Stigma linked to mental disease is at the level of xenophobia. The Russian public perceive the mentally sick as harmful, useless, incurable, and dangerous. The social stigma is maintained not only by the general public but also by psychiatrists.

Traditional values have largely endured attempts by Western institutions to impose a positive image of deviant behavior. For instance, in spite of the removal of homosexuality from the nomenclature of mental disorders, in 2014 62.5% of 450 surveyed psychiatrists in the Rostov Region viewed it as an illness, and up to three-quarters viewed it as immoral behavior. The psychiatrists sustain the ban on gay parades and the use of veiled schemes to lay off openly lesbian and gay persons from schools, child care centers, and other public institutions. In a 2013 inverview with Dozhd, Russia's chief psychiatrist, Zurab Kekelidze, said that  Homosexuality was continuously defined as a mental disorder by the Independent Psychiatric Association of Russia in 2005, when its president, Savenko, expressed his surprise at the proposal by the executive committee of the American Psychiatric Association to exclude homosexuality as a mental disorder from manuals on psychiatry. At the time he attributed this reclassification to political pressure from western NGOs and governments, called it antipsychiatric, and stated that the reasoning behind it was ideological, social and liberal rather than scientific. Savenko later changed his mind about homosexuality, and in a 2014 joint paper with Alexei Perekhov he stated that those who continue to advocate for classifying homosexuality as a mental disorder exhibit a Soviet mentality.

In 1994, a conference concerning the political abuse of psychiatry was attended by representatives from several former Soviet Republics including Russia, Belarus, the Baltics, the Caucasus, and some of the Central Asian Republics. Dainius Puras made a report on the situation within the Lithuanian Psychiatric Association, where discussion had been held but no resolution had been passed. Yuri Nuller talked over how in Russia the wind direction was gradually changing and the systematic political abuse of psychiatry was again being denied and degraded as an issue of "hyperdiagnosis" or "scientific disagreement." Among the proponents of this revisionist view was Tatyana Dmitrieva, Director of the Serbsky Institute and a close friend of the key architects of "political psychiatry."

In the early 1990s, she spoke the required words of repentance for political abuse of psychiatry which had had unprecedented dimensions in the Soviet Union for discrediting, intimidation and suppression of the human rights movement carried out primarily in this institution. Her words were widely broadcast abroad but were published only in the St. Petersburg newspaper Chas Pik within the country. However, in her 2001 book Aliyans Prava i Milosediya (The Alliance of Law and Mercy), Dmitrieva wrote that there were no psychiatric abuses and certainly no more than in Western countries. Moreover, the book makes the charge that professor Vladimir Serbsky and other intellectuals were wrong not to cooperate with the police department in preventing revolution and bloodshed and that the current generation is wrong to oppose the regime. In 2007, Dmitrieva asserted that the practice of "punitive psychiatry" had been grossly exaggerated, while nothing wrong had been done by the Serbsky Institute. After that an official at the Serbsky Institute declared "patient" Vladimir Bukovsky, who was then going to run for the President of the Russian Federation, undoubtedly "psychopathic".

While speaking of the Serbsky Center, Yuri Savenko alleges that "practically nothing has changed. They have no shame at the institute about their role with the Communists. They are the same people, and they do not want to apologize for all their actions in the past." Attorney Karen Nersisyan agrees: "Serbsky is not an organ of medicine. It's an organ of power." According to human rights activist and former psychiatrist Sofia Dorinskaya, the system of Soviet psychiatry has not been destroyed, the Serbsky Institute is standing where it did, the same people who worked in the Soviet system are working there. She says we have a situation like after the defeat of fascism in Germany, when fascism officially collapsed, but all governors of acres, judges and all people remained after the fascist regime.

In his article of 2002, Alan A. Stone, who as a member of team had examined Pyotr Grigorenko and found him mentally healthy in 1979, disregarded the findings of the World Psychiatric Association and the later avowal of Soviet psychiatrists themselves and put forward the academically revisionist theory that there was no political abuse of psychiatry as a tool against pacific dissidence in the former USSR. He asserted that it was time for psychiatry in the Western countries to reconsider the supposedly documented accounts of political abuse of psychiatry in the USSR in the hope of discovering that Soviet psychiatrists were more deserving of sympathy than condemnation. In Stone's words, he believes that Snezhnevsky was wrongly condemned by critics. According to Stone, one of the first points the Soviet psychiatrists who have been condemned for unethical political abuse of psychiatry make is that the revolution is the greatest good for the greatest number, the greatest piece of social justice, and the greatest beneficence imaginable in the twentieth century. In the Western view, the ethical compass of the Soviet psychiatrists begins to wander when they act in the service of this greatest beneficence.

According to St Petersburg psychiatrist Vladimir Pshizov, a disastrous factor for domestic psychiatry is that those who had committed the crime against humanity were allowed to stay on their positions until they can leave this world in a natural way. Those who retained their positions and influence turned domestic psychiatry from politically motivated one to criminally motivated one because the sphere of interests of this public has been reduced to making a business of psychopharmacologic drugs and taking possession of the homes of the ill. In Soviet times, all the heads of departments of psychiatry, all the directors of psychiatric research institutes, all the head doctors of psychiatric hospitals were the CPSU nomenklatura, which they remained so far. The representative of nomenklatura in psychiatry had the scheme of career that is simple and often stereotyped: for one to two years, he run errands as a resident, then joined the party and became a partgrouporg. His junior colleagues (usually non-partisan ones) collected and processed material for his dissertation. Its review of literature, particularly in a research institute for psychiatry, was often written by patients, because only they knew foreign languages, and their party comrades were not up to it, the natural habitat did not stimulate learning a foreign language.

Robert van Voren also says Russian psychiatry is now being headed by the same psychiatrists who was heading psychiatry in Soviet times. Since then Russian psychiatric system has not almost changed. In reality, we still see a sort of the Soviet psychiatry that was in the late 1980s. Russian psychiatrists do not have access to specialized literature published in other countries and do not understand what is world psychiatry. Staff training has not changed, literature is inaccessible, the same psychiatrists teach new generations of specialists. Those of them who know what is world psychiatry and know it is not the same as what is happening in Russia are silent and afraid. The powerful core of the old nomenklatura in psychiatry was concentrated in Moscow, and it was clear that the struggle inside their fortress would be not only difficult, but also it would be a waste of time, energy and resources, so the Global Initiative on Psychiatry has been avoiding Moscow almost completely for all the years. Instead, the Global Initiative on Psychiatry took active part in projects for reforming the mental health service in Ukraine, donated a printing plant to Ukrainian public, organized a publishing house, helped print a huge amount of medical and legal literature distributed for free, but the Ukrainian tax police accused the publishing house of manufacturing counterfeit dollars, and a significant part of humanitarian aid that the Global Initiative on Psychiatry had gathered in the Netherlands for Ukrainian psychiatric hospitals was stolen in Kyiv.

Many of the current leaders of Russian psychiatry, especially those who were related to the establishment in Soviet period, have resiled from their avowal read at the 1989 General Assembly of the WPA that Soviet psychiatry had been systematically abused for political purposes. Among such leaders who did so is Aleksandr Tiganov, a pupil of Snezhnevsky, full member of the Russian Academy of Medical Sciences, the director of its Mental Health Research Center, and the chief psychiatrist of the Ministry of Health of the Russian Federation. In 2011, when asked whether ill or healthy were those examined because of their disagreements with authority, Tiganov answered, "These people suffered from sluggish schizophrenia and were on the psychiatric registry." According to Tiganov, it was rumored that Snezhnevsky took pity on dissenters and gave them a diagnosis required for placing in a special hospital to save them from a prison, but it is not true, he honestly did his medical duty. The same ideas are voiced in the 2014 interview by Anatoly Smulevich, a pupil of Snezhnevsky, full member of the Russian Academy of Medical Sciences; he says what was attributed to Snesnevsky was that he recognized the healthy as the ill, it did not happen and is pure slander, it is completely ruled out for him to give a diagnosis to a healthy person.

In 2007, Mikhail Vinogradov, one of the leading staff members of the Serbsky Center, strongly degraded the human rights movement of the Soviet era in every possible way and tried to convince that all political dissidents who had been to his institution were indeed mentally ill. In his opinion, "now it is clear that all of them are deeply affected people." In 2012, Vinogradov said the same, "Do you talk about human rights activists? Most of them are just unhealthy people, I talked with them. As for the dissident General Grigorenko, I too saw him, kept him under observation, and noted oddities of his thinking. But he was eventually allowed to go abroad, as you know... Who? Bukovsky? I talked with him, and he is a completely crazy character. But he too was allowed to go abroad! You see, human rights activists are people who, due to their mental pathology, are unable to restrain themselves within the standards of society, and the West encourages their inability to do so." In the same year, he offered to restore Soviet mental health law and said it "has never been used for political persecution." Human rights activists who claim it did, in Vinogradov's words, "are not very mentally healthy."

Russian psychiatrist Fedor Kondratev not only denied accusations that he was ever personally engaged in Soviet abuses of psychiatry; he stated publicly that the very conception of the existence of Soviet-era "punitive psychiatry" was nothing more than: "the fantasy [vymysel] of the very same people who are now defending totalitarian sects. This is slander, which was [previously] used for anti-Soviet ends, but is now being used for anti-Russian ends." He says that there were attempts to use of psychiatry for political purposes but there was no mass psychiatric terror, he calls allegations about the terror a propagandistic weapon of activists of the Cold War. As Alexander Podrabinek writes, psychiatrists of punitive conscription and namely Kondratev are relatively indifferent to the public's indignation over illegal use of psychiatry both in Soviet times and now, they do not notice this public, allowing themselves to ignore any unprofessional opinion. In response to the article by Podrabinek, Kondratev instituted a suit against Podrabinek under Russian Civil Code Article 152 on protecting one's honor, dignity and business reputation. According to Valery Krasnov and Isaak Gurovich, official representatives of psychiatry involved in its political abuse never acknowledged the groundlessness of their diagnostics and actions. The absence of the acknowledgement and the absence of an analysis of made errors cast a shadow upon all psychiatrists in the USSR and, especially, in Russia. As Russian-American historian Georgi Chernyavsky writes, after the fall of the communist regime, no matter how some psychiatrists lean over backwards, foaming at the mouth to this day when stating that they were slandered, that they did not give dissidents diagnoses-sentences, or that, at least, these cases were isolated and not at all related to their personal activities, no matter how the doctors, if one may call them so, try to rebut hundreds if not thousands of real facts, it is undoable.

In 2004, Savenko stated that the passed law on the state expert activity and the introduction of the profession of forensic expert psychiatrist actually destroyed adversary-based examinations and that the Serbsky Center turned into the complete monopolist of forensic examination, which it had never been under Soviet rule. Formerly, the court could include any psychiatrist in a commission of experts, but now the court only chooses an expert institution. The expert has the right to participate only in commissions that he is included in by the head of his expert institution, and can receive the certificate of qualification as an expert only after having worked in a state expert institution for three years. The Director of the Serbsky Center Dmitrieva was, at the same time, the head of the forensic psychiatry department which is the only one in the country and is located in her Center. No one had ever had such a monopoly.

According to Savenko, the Serbsky Center has long labored to legalize its monopolistic position of the main expert institution of the country. The ambition and permissiveness—which, due to proximity to power, allow the Serbsky Center to get in touch over the telephone with the judges and explain to them who is who and what is the guideline, although the judges themselves have already learned it—have turned out to be a considerable drop in the level of the expert reports on many positions. Such a drop was inevitable and foreseeable in the context of the Serbsky Center efforts to eliminate adversary character of the expert reports of the parties, then to maximally degrade the role of the specialist as a reviewer and critic of the presented expert report, and to legalize the state of affairs. Lyubov Vinogradova believes there has been a continuous diminution in patients' rights as independent experts are now excluded from processes, cannot speak in court and can do nothing against the State experts.

On 28 May 2009, Yuri Savenko wrote to the then President of the Russian Federation Dmitry Medvedev an open letter, in which Savenko asked Medvedev to submit to the State Duma a draft law prepared by the Independent Psychiatric Association of Russia to address the sharp drop in the level of forensic psychiatric examinations, which Savenko attributed to the lack of competition within the sector and its increasing nationalization. The open letter says that the level of the expert reports has dropped to such an extent that it is often a matter of not only the absence of entire sections of the report, even such as the substantiation of its findings, and not only the gross contradiction of its findings to the descriptive section of the report, but it is often a matter of concrete statements which are so contrary to generally accepted scientific terms that doubts about the disinterestedness of the experts arise. According to the letter, courts, in violation of procedural rules, do not analyze the expert report, its coherence and consistency in all its parts, do not check experts' findings for their accuracy, completeness, and objectivity.

On 15 June 2009, the working group chaired by the Director of the Serbsky Center Tatyana Dmitrieva sent the Supreme Court of the Russian Federation a joint application whose purport was to declare appealing against the forensic expert reports of state expert institutions illegal and prohibit courts from receiving lawsuits filed to appeal against the reports. The reason put forward for the proposal was that the appeals against the expert reports were allegedly filed "without regard for the scope of the case" and that one must appeal against the expert report "only together with the sentence." In other words, according to Yuri Savenko, all professional errors and omissions are presented as untouchable by virtue of the fact that they were infiltrated into the sentence. That is cynicism of administrative resources, cynicism of power, he says.

The draft of the application to the Supreme Court of the Russian Federation was considered in the paper "Current legal issues relevant to forensic-psychiatric expert evaluation" by Yelena Shchukina and Sergey Shishkov focusing on the inadmissibility of appealing against the expert report without regard for the scope of the evaluated case. While talking about appealing against "the reports", the authors of the paper, according to lawyer Dmitry Bartenev, mistakenly identify the reports with actions of the experts (or an expert institution) and justify the impossibility of the "parallel" examination and evaluation of the actions of the experts without regard for the scope of the evaluated case. Such a conclusion made by the authors appears clearly erroneous because abuse by the experts of rights and legitimate interests of citizens including trial participants, of course, may be a subject for a separate appeal.

According to the warning made in 2010 by Yuri Savenko at the same Congress, prof. Anatoly Smulevich, author of the monographs Problema Paranoyi (The Problem of Paranoia) (1972) and Maloprogredientnaya Shizofreniya (Continuous Sluggish Schizophrenia) (1987), which had contributed to the hyperdiagnosis of "sluggish schizophrenia", again began to play the same role he played before. Recently, under his influence therapists began to widely use antidepressants and antipsychotics but often in inadequate cases and in inappropriate doses, without consulting psychiatrists. This situation has opened up a huge new market for pharmaceutical firms, with their unlimited capabilities, and the flow of the mentally ill to internists. Smulevich bases the diagnosis of continuous sluggish schizophrenia, in particular, on appearance and lifestyle and stresses that the forefront in the picture of negative changes is given to the contrast between retaining mental activity (and sometimes quite high capacity for work) and mannerism, unusualness of one's appearance and entire lifestyle.

According to the commentary by the Independent Psychiatric Association of Russia on the 2007 text by Vladimir Rotstein, a doctrinist of Snezhnevsky's school, there are sufficient patients with delusion of reformism in psychiatric inpatient facilities for involuntary treatment. In 2012, delusion of reformism was mentioned as a symptom of mental disorder in Psychiatry. National Manual edited by Tatyana Dmitrieva, Valery Krasnov, Nikolai Neznanov, Valentin Semke, and Alexander Tiganov. In the same year, Vladimir Pashkovsky in his paper reported that he diagnosed 4.7 percent of 300 patients with delusion of reform. As Russian sociologist Alexander Tarasov notes, you will be treated in a hospital so that you and all your acquaintances get to learn forever that only such people as Anatoly Chubais or German Gref can be occupied with reforming in our country; and you are suffering from "syndrome of litigiousness" if in addition you wrote to the capital city complaints, which can be written only by a reviewing authority or lawyer.

According to Doctor of Legal Sciences Vladimir Ovchinsky, regional differences in forensic psychiatric expert reports are striking. For example, in some regions of Russia, 8 or 9 percent of all examinees are pronounced sane; in other regions up to 75 percent of all examinees are pronounced sane. In some regions less than 2 percent of examinees are declared schizophrenics; in other regions up to 80 percent of examinees are declared schizophrenics.

In April 1995, the State Duma considered the first draft of a law that would have established a State Medical Commission with a psychiatrist to certify the competence of the President, the Prime Minister, and high federal political officials to fulfill the responsibilities of their positions. In 2002, Ukrainian psychiatrist Ada Korotenko stated that today the question was raised about the use of psychiatry to settle political accounts and establish psychiatric control over people competing for power in the country. Obviously, one will find supporters of the feasibility of such a filter, she said, though is it worthwhile to substitute experts' medical reports for elections? In 2003, the suggestion of using psychiatry to prevent and dismiss officials from their positions was supported by Alexander Podrabinek, author of the book Punitive Medicine, a 265-page monograph covering political abuses of psychiatry in the Soviet Union. He suggested that people who seek high positions or run for the legislature should bring from the psychiatric dispensary a reference that they are not on the psychiatric registry and should be subjected to psychiatric examination in the event of inappropriate behavior. Concerned about the problem, authorities ruled that the Russian Mental Health Law should not be applied to senior officials and the judiciary on the ground that they are vested with parliamentary or judicial immunity. A psychiatrist who violates this rule can be deprived of his diploma and sentenced to imprisonment. In 2011, Russian psychiatrists again tried to promote the idea that one's marked aspiration in itself for power can be referred to psychopathic symptoms and that there are statistics about 60 percent of current leaders of states suffering from various forms of mental abnormalities.

Documents and memoirs 
The evidence for the misuse of psychiatry for political purposes in the Soviet Union was documented in a number of articles and books. Several national psychiatric associations examined and acted upon this documentation.

The widely known sources including published and written memoirs by victims of psychiatric arbitrariness convey moral and physical sufferings experienced by the victims in special psychiatric hospitals of the USSR.

Samizdat documentation 
In August 1969, Natalya Gorbanevskaya completed Noon ("Полдень"), her book about the case of the 25 August 1968 Demonstration on Red Square and began circulating it in samizdat. It was translated into English and published under the title Red Square at Noon. Parts of the book describe Special Psychiatric Hospitals and psychiatric examinations of dissidents. The book includes "On Special Psychiatric Hospitals", an article written by Pyotr Grigorenko in 1968.

In 1971, twin brothers Zhores Medvedev and Roy Medvedev published in London their joint account of Zhores' incarceration in a psychiatric hospital and the Soviet practice of diagnosing political oppositionists as the mentally ill in London, in both English A Question of Madness: Repression by Psychiatry in the Soviet Union and Russian (Who is Mad? "Кто сумасшедший") editions.

Yury Maltsev's Report from a Madhouse, his memoirs in Russian ("Репортаж из сумасшедшего дома"), were issued by the New York-based Novy zhurnal publishing house in 1974.

1975 saw the article "My Five Years in Mental Hospitals" by Viktor Fainberg, who had emigrated to France the previous year after four years in the Leningrad Special Psychiatric Hospital.

In 1976, Viktor Nekipelov published in samizdat his book Institute of Fools: Notes on the Serbsky Institute documenting his personal experiences during two months' examination at the Serbsky Institute in Moscow. In 1980, the book was translated and published in English. The book was first published in Russia in 2005.

Professional associations and Human Rights groups 
Various documents and reports were published in the Information Bulletin of the Working Commission on the Abuse of Psychiatry For Political Purposes, and circulated in the samizdat periodical Chronicle of Current Events. Other sources were documents by the Moscow Helsinki Group and in books by Alexander Podrabinek (Punitive Medicine, 1979) Anatoly Prokopenko (Mad Psychiatry, 1997, "Безумная психитрия") by and Vladimir Bukovsky (Judgment in Moscow, 1994). To these may be added Soviet psychiatry – fallacies and fantasy by Ada Korotenko and Natalia Alikina ("Советская психиатрия. Заблуждения и умысел") and Executed by Madness, 1971 ("Казнимые сумасшествием").

In 1972, 1975, 1976, 1984, and 1988 the United States Government Printing Office published documents on political abuse of psychiatry in the Soviet Union .

From 1987 to 1991, the International Association on the Political Use of Psychiatry (IAPUP) published forty-two volumes of Documents on the Political Abuse of Psychiatry in the USSR. Today these are preserved by the Columbia University Libraries in the archival collection entitled Human
Rights Watch Records: Helsinki Watch, 1952–2003, Series VII: Chris Panico Files, 1979–1992, USSR, Psychiatry, International Association on
the Political Use of Psychiatry, Box 16, Folder 5–8 (English version) and Box 16, Folder 9–11 (Russian version).

In 1992, the British Medical Association published certain some documents on the subject in Medicine Betrayed: The Participation of Doctors in Human Rights Abuses.

Memoirs 
In 1978, the book I Vozvrashchaetsa Veter... (And the Wind Returns...) by Vladimir Bukovsky, describing the dissident movement, their struggle or freedom, practices of dealing with dissenters, and dozen years spent by Bukovsky in Soviet labor camps, prisons and psychiatric hospitals, was published and later translated into English under the title To Build a Castle: My Life as a Dissenter.

In 1979, Leonid Plyushch published his book Na Karnavale Istorii (At History's Сarnival) in which he described how he and other dissidents were committed to psychiatric hospitals. The same year, the book was translated into English under the title History's Carnival: A Dissident's Autobiography.

In 1980, the book by Yuri Belov Razmyshlenia ne tolko o Sychovke: Roslavl 1978 (Reflections not only on Sychovka: Roslavl 1978) was published.

In 1981, Pyotr Grigorenko published his memoirs V Podpolye Mozhno Vstretit Tolko Krys (In Underground One Can Meet Only Rats), which included the story of his psychiatric examinations and hospitalizations. In 1982, the book was translated into English under the title Memoirs.

In 1982, Soviet philosopher Pyotr Abovin-Yegides published his article "Paralogizmy politseyskoy psikhiatrii i ikh sootnoshenie s meditsinskoy etikoy (Paralogisms of police psychiatry and their relation to medical ethics)."

In 1983, Evgeny Nikolaev's book Predavshie Gippokrata (Betrayers of Hippocrates), when translated from Russian into German under the title Gehirnwäsche in Moskau (Brainwashing in Moscow), first came out in München and told about psychiatric detention of its author for political reasons. In 1984, the book under its original title was first published in Russian which the book had originally been written in.

In 1983, Yuri Vetokhin published his memoirs Sklonen k Pobegu translated into English under the title Inclined to Escape in 1986.

In 1987, Robert van Voren published his book Koryagin: A man Struggling for Human Dignity telling about psychiatrist Anatoly Koryagin who resisted political abuse of psychiatry in the Soviet Union.

In 1988, Reportazh iz Niotkuda (Reportage from Nowhere) by Viktor Rafalsky was published. In the publication, he described his confinement in Soviet psychiatric hospitals.

In 1993, Valeriya Novodvorskaya published her collection of writings Po Tu Storonu Otchayaniya (Beyond Despair) in which her experience in the prison psychiatric hospital in Kazan was described.

In 1996, Vladimir Bukovsky published his book Moskovsky Protsess (Moscow trial)
containing an account of developing the punitive psychiatry based on
documents that were being submitted to and considered by the Politburo of the Central Committee of the Communist Party of the Soviet Union. The book was translated into English in 1998 under the title Reckoning With Moscow: A Nuremberg Trial for Soviet Agents and Western Fellow Travelers.

In 2001, Nikolay Kupriyanov published his book GULAG-2-SN which has a foreword by Anatoly Sobchak, covers repressive psychiatry in Soviet Army, and tells about humiliations Kupriyanov underwent in the psychiatric departments of the Northern Fleet hospital and the Kirov Military Medical Academy.

In 2002, St. Petersburg forensic psychiatrist Vladimir Pshizov published his book Sindrom Zamknutogo Prostranstva (Syndrome of Closed Space) describing the hospitalization of Viktor Fainberg.

In 2003, the book Moyа Sudba i Moyа Borba protiv Psikhiatrov (My Destiny and My Struggle against Psychiatrists) was published by Anatoly Serov, who worked as a lead design engineer before he was committed to a psychiatric hospital.

In 2010, Alexander Shatravka published his book Pobeg iz Raya (Escape from Paradise) in which he described how he and his companions were caught after they illegally crossed the border between Finland and the Soviet Union to escape from the latter country and, as a result, were confined to Soviet psychiatric hospitals and prisons. In his book, he also described methods of brutal treatment of prisoners in the institutions.

In 2012, Soviet dissident and believer Vladimir Khailo's wife published her book Subjected to Intense Persecution.

2014 saw the book Zha Zholtoy Stenoy (Behind the Yellow Wall) by Alexander Avgust, a former inmate of Soviet psychiatric hospitals who in his book describes the wider circle of their inhabitants than literature on the issue usually does.

Literary works 
In 1965, Valery Tarsis published in the West his book Ward 7: An Autobiographical Novel based upon his own experiences in 1963–1964 when he was detained in the Moscow Kashchenko psychiatric hospital for political reasons. The book was the first literary work to deal with the Soviet authorities' abuse of psychiatry.

In 1968, the Russian poet Joseph Brodsky wrote Gorbunov and Gorchakov, a forty-page long poem in thirteen cantos consisting of lengthy conversations between two patients in a Soviet psychiatric prison as well as between each of them separately and the interrogating psychiatrists. The topics vary from the taste of the cabbage served for supper to the meaning of life and Russia's destiny. The poem was translated into English by Harry Thomas. The experience underlying Gorbunov and Gorchakov was formed by two stints of Brodsky at psychiatric establishments.

In 1977, British playwright Tom Stoppard wrote the play Every Good Boy Deserves Favour that criticized the Soviet practice of treating political dissidence as a form of mental illness. The play is dedicated to Viktor Fainberg and Vladimir Bukovsky, two Soviet dissidents expelled to the West.

In the 1983 novel Firefox Down by Craig Thomas, captured American pilot Mitchell Gant is imprisoned in a KGB psychiatric clinic "associated with the Serbsky Institute", where he is drugged and interrogated to force him to reveal the location of the Firefox aircraft, which he has stolen and flown out of Russia.

Documentaries 
The use of psychiatry for political purposes in the USSR was discussed in several television documentaries:
 They Chose Freedom, produced by Vladimir V. Kara-Murza in 2005
 Prison Psychiatry, produced by Anatoly Yaroshevsky of NTV in 2005
 Parallels, Events, People (an episode Punitive Psychiatry) produced by Natella Boltyanskaya for the Voice of America in 2014
 Psychiatric Practices in the Soviet Union (TV interview), produced by C-SPAN on 17 July 1989 with the participation of William Farrand, Peter Reddaway, Darrel Regier, who were members of the US delegation during its visit to Soviet psychiatric facilities in February 1989.

See also 
 1968 Red Square demonstration
 Civil commitment
 Political abuse of psychiatry in the United States
 Struggle against political abuse of psychiatry in the Soviet Union
 The Protest Psychosis: How Schizophrenia Became a Black Disease
 Socialist Patients' Collective, Marxist anti-psychiatry group

References

Sources 

Archival sources
 
 

Government publications and official reports
 
 
 
 
 
 
 
 
 
 
 
 
 
 

Books
 
 
 
 
 
 
 
 
 
 
 
 
 
 
 
  
 
 
 
 
 
 
 
 
 
 
 
 
 
 
 
 
 
 
 
 
 
 
 
 
 
 
 
 
 
  The ISBN printed in the document (978-5-9977-0014-9) is bad; it causes a checksum error.
 
 
 
 
 
 
 
 
 
 
 
 
 
 
 
 
 
 
 
 
 
 
 
 
 
 
 
 
  
 
 
 
 
 
 
 
 
 
 
 
 
 
 
 
 
 
 
 
 
 
 
 
 
 
  Russian text: 
 
 

Journal articles and book chapters
 
 
 
 
 
 
 
 
 
 
 
 
 
 
 
 
 
 
 
 
 
 
 
 
 
 
 
  
 
 
 
 
 
 
 
 
 
 
 
 
 
 
 
 
 
 
 
 
 
 
 
 
 
 
 
 
 
 
 
 
 
 
 
 
 
 
 
 
 
 
 
 
 
 
 
 
 
 
 
 
 
 
 
 
 
 
 
 
 
 
 
 
 
 
 
 
 
 
 
 
 
 
 
 
 
 
 
 
 
 
 
 
 
 
 
 
 
 
 
 
 
 
 
 
 
 
 
 
 
 
 
 
 
 
 
 
 

Newspapers
 
 
 
 
 
 
 
 
 
  Russian text: 
 
 
 
 
  Russian text: 
 
 
 
 
 
 
 

Websites
 
 
 
 
 
 
 
 
 
 
 
 
 
 
 
 
 
 
 
 
 

Audio-visual material
 
  Russian version:

Further reading 
 
   (The Russian text of the book )
 
 
 
 
 
 
 
 
  Russian text: 
 
 
 
 

 
Political repression in the Soviet Union
Persecution of dissidents in the Soviet Union
Mental health in the Soviet Union
Unnecessary health care
Human rights in the Soviet Union
Human rights abuses in the Soviet Union
Control (social and political)
Social problems in medicine
Ethics in psychiatry
Soviet law
Cold War history of the Soviet Union
Era of Stagnation